The Cirque Royal (French) or Koninklijk Circus (Dutch), meaning "Royal Circus", is an entertainment venue in Brussels, Belgium.

Conceived by the architect Wilhelm Kuhnen, the building has a circular appearance, but in fact is constructed as a regular polygon. It can hold 3,500 spectators, and nowadays is primarily used for live music shows.

External links

 

Buildings and structures in Brussels
City of Brussels
Culture in Brussels
Concert halls in Belgium
Tourist attractions in Brussels